The Journal of Clinical Pharmacy and Therapeutics is a bimonthly peer-reviewed medical journal covering all aspects of clinical pharmacy and therapeutics. It was established in 1976 and is published by Wiley-Blackwell. The editor-in-chief is A. Li Wan Po (Centre for Evidence-Based Pharmacotherapy).

Abstracting and indexing
The journal is abstracted and indexed in:

According to the Journal Citation Reports, the journal has a 2014 impact factor of 1.668.

References

External links

Pharmacology journals
English-language journals
Bimonthly journals
Publications established in 1976
Wiley-Blackwell academic journals